Joey Mormina (born June 29, 1982) is a Canadian former professional ice hockey defenceman who was a veteran of the American Hockey League (AHL) playing in 670 regular season games. He played a solitary game in the National Hockey League (NHL) with the Carolina Hurricanes.

Playing career
Mormina was drafted 193rd overall by the Philadelphia Flyers in the 2002 NHL Entry Draft from Colgate University. Without a contract from the Flyers, Mormina began his professional career by playing two seasons with the Manchester Monarchs, the AHL affiliate of the Los Angeles Kings.

On July 2, 2007, Mormina signed with the Carolina Hurricanes and received his first callup to the NHL. Mormina consequently played in one game for the Hurricanes before being sent back to the AHL. On July 8, 2008, Mormina signed with the Pittsburgh Penguins and spent the entire 2008–09 season with the Wilkes-Barre/Scranton Penguins. On July 9, 2009, Mormina returned to the franchise that originally drafted him, signing a one-year contract with the Philadelphia Flyers.

On August 5, 2010, Mormina signed a contract with the DEL's Kassel Huskies. However, the Huskies declaring bankruptcy on August 27, 2010, Mormina became an unrestricted free agent again. On September 7, 2010, Mormina signed a contract with the EC Red Bull Salzburg of the Erste Bank Hockey League. After featuring in a European pre-season tournament, Mormina sought a release from Salzburg and returned to North America, returning to Wilkes-Barre/Scranton Penguins for the 2010–11 season.

During the 2015–16 season, while in his third year with the Syracuse Crunch, Mormina was traded to the Rochester Americans for future considerations on March 4, 2016. Upon the conclusion of the season with the Americans, Mormina ended his professional career after 11 seasons in accepting an assistant coaching role with the Mercyhurst University on September 21, 2016.

Career statistics

Awards and honors

See also
List of players who played only one game in the NHL

References

External links

1982 births
Living people
Adirondack Phantoms players
Albany River Rats players
Anglophone Quebec people
Canadian ice hockey defencemen
Carolina Hurricanes players
Colgate Raiders men's ice hockey players
EC Red Bull Salzburg players
Ice hockey people from Montreal
Manchester Monarchs (AHL) players
Philadelphia Flyers draft picks
Rochester Americans players
Syracuse Crunch players
Wilkes-Barre/Scranton Penguins players
Canadian expatriate ice hockey players in Austria